Peter Louis Galison (born May 17, 1955, New York, New York) is an American historian and philosopher of science. He is the Joseph Pellegrino University Professor in history of science and physics at Harvard University.

Biography
Galison received his Ph.D. at Harvard University in both physics and in the history of science in 1983.  His publications include Image and Logic:  A Material Culture of Microphysics (1997) and Einstein's Clocks, Poincaré's Maps: Empires of Time. His most recent book (2007), co-authored with Lorraine Daston, is titled Objectivity.

Before moving to Harvard, Galison taught for several years at Stanford University, where he was professor of history, philosophy, and physics.  He is considered a member of the Stanford School of philosophy of science, a group that also includes Ian Hacking, John Dupré, and Nancy Cartwright.

Galison developed a film for the History Channel on the development of the hydrogen bomb, and has done work on the intersection of science with other disciplines, in particular art (along with his wife, Caroline A. Jones) and architecture. He is on the editorial board of Critical Inquiry and was a MacArthur Fellow in 1996.

Philosophical work
In Image and Logic, Galison explored the fundamental rift rising in the physical sciences: whether singular, visual accounts of scientific phenomena would be accepted as the dominant language of proof, or whether statistically significant, frequently repeated results would dominate the field. This division, Galison claims, can be seen in the conflicts amongst high-energy physicists investigating new particles, some of whom offer up statistically significant and frequently replicated analysis of the new particle passing through electric fields, others of whom offer up a single picture of a particle behaving—in a single instance—in a way that cannot be explained by the characteristics of existing known particles. This image/logic distinction has been applied to explore the development of other disciplines, for example, archaeology. 

His work with Lorraine Daston developed the concept of mechanical objectivity which is often used in scholarly literature, and he has done pioneering work on applying the anthropological notion of trading zones to scientific practice.

Documentary films 
Galison has been involved in the production of several documentary films. The first, The Ultimate Weapon: The H-Bomb Dilemma, was about the political and scientific decisions behind the creation of the first hydrogen bomb in the United States, and premiered on the History Channel in 2000. The second, Secrecy, which Galison directed with Harvard filmmaker Robb Moss, is about the costs and benefits of government secrecy, and premiered at the 2008 Sundance Film Festival. Also from Harvard, Ruth Lingford worked on the animation for Secrecy.  Galison completed his third documentary film Containment, also directed with Robb Moss, in 2015. It premiered at the 2015 Full Frame Documentary Film Festival, and has been shown at film festivals around the world including in Brazil, Switzerland, and Australia. This documentary investigates governments' attempts to contain a hundred million gallons of deadly radioactive sludge for 10,000 years: how can people warn future generations across this immense time span during which languages, cultures and the environment will continually transform?

Galison's fourth documentary, Black Holes: The Edge of All We Know, about the Event Horizon Telescope, appeared in 2021 on Netflix and Apple TV.

Bibliography

Filmography
The Ultimate Weapon: The H-Bomb Dilemma (2000) Writer/producer, 44 minutes. Premiere: The History Channel, 2000.
Secrecy (2008) Producer/Director (with Robb Moss), 85 minutes. Premiere: The Sundance Film Festival (2008).
Containment (2015) Producer/Director (with Robb Moss), 81 minutes. Premiere: Full Frame Documentary Film Festival, Durham, North Carolina (2015).
Black Holes:  The Edge of All We Know (2021) Director, 99 minutes.

References

External links

Galison's history of science homepage
Galison's physics homepage 
Article about Galison from the New York Times
Interview with Galison about his Einstein book
Galison appointed University Professor Harvard Gazette
 
SECRECY — homepage for previous Galison and Moss documentary
CONTAINMENT — homepage for latest Galison and Moss documentary
2015 Video Interview with Peter Galison by Atomic Heritage Foundation Voices of the Manhattan Project
Galison's "Removing Knowledge"

MacArthur Fellows
Harvard Graduate School of Arts and Sciences alumni
Harvard University faculty
American historians of science
Philosophers of science
Living people
21st-century American physicists
1955 births
Stanford University Department of History faculty
Stanford University Department of Philosophy faculty
Stanford University Department of Physics faculty
20th-century American historians
American male non-fiction writers
21st-century American historians
20th-century American male writers